Onuma Sittirak (born June 13, 1986 in Khian Sa)  is a retired Thai volleyball player was a member of Thailand women's national volleyball team. She was born 13 June 1986 at Surat Thani, Thailand. Onuma graduated from Ratna Bundit University

Career
Onuma started playing volleyball as a spiker for Thailand's national team in 2006. In 2009, she helped the Thai team won the Asian Championship for the first time and was also awarded the Most Valuable Player of the tournament. During the tournament, she was called "Thailand's Toy Cannon" in an article by the Asian Volleyball Confederation.

In addition, Onuma won the 2009 Asian Club Championship with her team Federbrau and was selected as the Most Valuable Player and Best Spiker.

She repeated as champion in the 2010 Asian Club Championship and also won the Best Spiker and Best Scorer of the event. She later participated in the 2010 Club World Championship, finishing in the fifth place playing with Federbrau and the 2011 Club World Championship also ranked fifth, this time with Chang.

In 2013 she won the 8th Siamsport Awards Popular Vote.

On 6 August 2014 it was announced that she will be joining JT Marvelous.

She was on the list 2019 Korea-Thailand all star super match competition.

Onuma retired at the age of 35, after the 2021 FIVB Volleyball Women's Nations League.

Clubs
  BEC World (2004)
  Filly (2005–2006)
  Quang Ninh VC (2007–2008)
  Federbrau (2008–2009)
  Zeiler Köniz (2008–2010)
  Kathu Phuket (2010)
  Dinamo Kazan (2010–2011)
  Chang (2010–2011)
  Kathu Phuket (2011–2012)
  Igtisadchi Baku (2012–2014)
  Idea Khonkaen (2013)
  Nakhon Ratchasima (2014–2016)
  JT Marvelous (2014–2017)
  Nakhon Ratchasima (2017–2019)
 Diamond Food (2019–2022)
  Kinh Bac Bac Ninh VC (2022)
  Geleximco Thai Binh VC (2022)
  Nakhon Ratchasima QminC (2022–present)

Awards

Individuals
 2004 Asian Club Championship – "Miss Volleyball"
 2009 Asian Championship – "Most Valuable Player"
 2009 Asian Club Championship – "Most Valuable Player"
 2009 Asian Club Championship – "Best Spiker"
 2010 Asian Club Championship – "Best Scorer"
 2010 Asian Club Championship – "Best Spiker"
 2011–12 Thailand League – "Best Scorer"
 2012 Asian Cup – "Most Valuable Player"
 2012 Asian Cup – "Best Scorer"
 2012 Asian Cup – "Best Spiker"
 2013 Thai-Denmark Super League – "Most Valuable Player"
 2013 FIVB World Grand Champions Cup – "Best Outside Spiker"
 2018–19 Thailand League – "Most Valuable Player"

Clubs
 2010–11 Russian Super League –  Champion, with Dinamo Kazan
 2010–11 Thailand League –  Champion, with Kathu Phuket
 2012–13 Azerbaijan Super League –  Runner-up, with Igtisadchi Baku
 2013 Thai–Denmark Super League –  Champion, with Idea Khonkaen
 2013–14 Thailand League –  Champion, with Nakhon Ratchasima
 2014–15 V.Challenge League –  Champion, with JT Marvelous
 2015–16 V.Challenge League –  Champion, with JT Marvelous
 2017–18 Thailand League –  Runner-up, with Nakhon Ratchasima
 2018–19 Thailand League –  Champion, with Nakhon Ratchasima
 2009 Asian Club Championship –  Champion, with Federbrau
 2010 Asian Club Championship –  Champion, with Federbrau
 2011 Asian Club Championship –   Champion, with Chang
 2012 Asian Club Championship –  Bronze medal, with Chang

Royal decorations 
 2015 -  Companion (Fourth Class) of The Most Admirable Order of the Direkgunabhorn
 2013 -  Commander (Third Class) of The Most Exalted Order of the White Elephant
 2010 -  Gold Medalist (Sixth Class) of The Most Admirable Order of the Direkgunabhorn

References

External links

1986 births
Living people
Onuma Sittirak
Asian Games medalists in volleyball
Volleyball players at the 2006 Asian Games
Volleyball players at the 2010 Asian Games
Volleyball players at the 2014 Asian Games
Volleyball players at the 2018 Asian Games
Igtisadchi Baku volleyball players
Onuma Sittirak
JT Marvelous players
Onuma Sittirak
Onuma Sittirak
Onuma Sittirak
Medalists at the 2014 Asian Games
Medalists at the 2018 Asian Games
Universiade medalists in volleyball
Onuma Sittirak
Onuma Sittirak
Southeast Asian Games medalists in volleyball
Competitors at the 2007 Southeast Asian Games
Competitors at the 2009 Southeast Asian Games
Competitors at the 2011 Southeast Asian Games
Competitors at the 2013 Southeast Asian Games
Competitors at the 2015 Southeast Asian Games
Universiade bronze medalists for Thailand
Competitors at the 2019 Southeast Asian Games
Outside hitters
Medalists at the 2013 Summer Universiade
Onuma Sittirak
Onuma Sittirak
Expatriate volleyball players in Switzerland
Thai expatriate sportspeople in Azerbaijan
Thai expatriate sportspeople in Japan
Thai expatriate sportspeople in Turkey
Thai expatriate sportspeople in Switzerland
Thai expatriate sportspeople in Vietnam
Thai expatriate sportspeople in Russia
Expatriate volleyball players in Japan
Expatriate volleyball players in Russia
Expatriate volleyball players in Turkey
Expatriate volleyball players in Azerbaijan
Expatriate volleyball players in Vietnam